Shokhrukh Kirgizboevich Kirgizboev (born 3 August 1987) is a Tajik professional football player who currently plays for Khujand, on loan from FC Istiklol.

Career

Club
On 7 August 2021, Istiklol announced the signing of Kirgizboev. On 19 March 2022, Kirgizboev joined Khujand on loan for the season from Istiklol.

International
Kirgizboev made his senior team debut on 13 December 2018 against Oman, which ended as their 1–2 loss.

Career statistics

Club

International

Honours
Istiklol
 Tajikistan Higher League (1): 2021

Tajikistan
King's Cup: 2022

References

External links
 

1987 births
Living people
Tajikistani footballers
Tajikistan international footballers
Association football goalkeepers